Joshua Houston (1822–1902) was born into slavery in 1822 on the Perry County, Alabama plantation owned by Temple Lea and Nancy Moffette Lea, parents of Margaret Lea Houston. When Margaret married Sam Houston, Joshua moved to Texas with the newlyweds. Joshua traveled with Sam Houston and worked on the construction of Raven Hill in Huntsville, Texas. He became educated and was elected to local public offices. He had three wives and was the father of eight children, including Samuel Walker Houston. Joshua was a Texas delegate at the 1884 Republican National Convention. He helped establish the Bishop Ward Normal and Collegiate Institute.

Sam Houston slaves

The story of Sam Houston freeing his slaves before his 1863 death, in particular Joshua, has been passed down through history, and is recounted in various books. In From Slave To Statesman, author Patricia Smith Prather depicts Houston reading a newspaper story to his slaves in the fall of 1862, about Abraham Lincoln's September 1862 Emancipation Proclamation, telling them they would all be free as of January 1, 1863. The Emancipation Proclamation was not announced in Texas until June 1865, Juneteenth, two months after Robert E. Lee surrendered at Appomattox.

In 1861, the Texas legislature amended its Constitution of 1845, making it illegal to free slaves in the state.

 Additionally, Section I removed any possibility of reverting that, "The Legislature shall have no power to pass laws for the emancipation of slaves".

When Houston died in 1863, his slaves were part of the inventory of his estate and  valued at $10,530. Joshua's son Samuel Walker Houston was born in February 1864, seven months after Sam Houston's death, and is always referred to as having been born into slavery.

Death
Joshua Houston died in 1902 and was buried at Oakwood Cemetery in Huntsville, the same cemetery where Sam Houston is buried.

See also
History of slavery in Texas

References

Further reading

External links
 Joshua Houston at Handbook of Texas Online
 

1822 births
1902 deaths
19th-century American slaves
Texas Republicans
People from Huntsville, Texas
People from Perry County, Alabama
Sam Houston